Hanshi Khushi Club is a 2009 Bengali comedy film directed by Shankha Bandyopadhyay. The film's music was composed by Shankha Bandyopadhyay.

Cast
 Jeet as Aniket
 Barsha Priyadarshini as Hiya
 Biswajit Chakraborty as Mama Da
 Papiya Adhikari as Ranjana Boudi
 Bireswar Mukhopadhyay
 Biswanath Basu as Kobi
 Mimi Dutta as Riya

Soundtrack
"Hasi Khushi Club" -Pratik Chowdhury
"Cholo Na Jayee" - Javed Ali, Debjani Dutta
"Amaar Bhitor O Bahire" - Debjani Dutta
"Ghorete Bhromor Elo" - Debjani Dutta
"Mono Pakhi" (version 1) - Javed Ali, Debjani Dutta
"Mono Pakhi" (version 2) - Kumar Sanu, Debjani Dutta
"Phule Phule" - Debjani Dutta
"Muktiro Mandiro Sopano Tole" (version 1) - Sankha Banerjee
"Muktiro Mandiro Sopano Tole"(version 2) -Kumar Sanu

References

External links
 
 Hanshi Khushi Club  on Gomolo

2009 films
Bengali-language Indian films
Indian comedy films
2000s Bengali-language films